The following is a list of people from Santa Clarita, California:

People

 Trevor Bauer, Major League Baseball
 Crystl Bustos, softball athlete
 Marilyn Chambers, Adult film actress
 Mike Garcia, current representative for California's 25th congressional district
 Tyler Glasnow, Major League Baseball
 Mandy Gonzalez, actress and singer
 William S. Hart, film star
 Katie Hill, former representative for California's 25th congressional district
 Taylor Lautner, actor
 Buck McKeon, politician
 Cesar Millan, dog behaviorist
 Tommy Milone, Major League Baseball
 Alysia Montaño, track and field
 Olivia Moultrie, soccer player
 Dee Dee Myers, White House press secretary
 John J. Nazarian, television commentator and private investigator
 Tyler Posey, actor
 Atticus Shaffer, actor
 James Shields, Major League Baseball
 Shane Vereen, National Football League
 Abbey Weitzeil, Olympic swimmer and medalist
 Danny Worth, Major League Baseball

References

Santa Clarita, California